Love Is the Message is Misia's second studio album, released on January 1, 2000. It sold 1,349,650 copies in its first week, making it the 23rd highest debut in Japanese history, and peaked at #1 for two consecutive weeks. It went on to sell over 2.29 million copies, making Misia one of the three acts, alongside Globe and Chemistry, with the second most consecutive double million albums, behind Hikaru Utada. Love Is the Message was the recipient of the award for best album at the 42nd Japan Record Awards. The album jacket was shot during sunrise at the summit of the Haleakala National Park in Maui, Hawaii. Love Is the Message is the 56th best-selling album of all time in Japan.

Track listing

Charts

Oricon Sales Chart

References

External links
Sony Music Online Japan : Misia

2000 albums
Misia albums
Japanese-language albums